Giuseppe Faraca (29 August 1959 – 4 May 2016) was an Italian professional cyclist. He most known for winning the Young rider Classification in the 1981 Giro d'Italia. His highest finishing in the Giro d'Italia was the year he won the Young rider classification, he placed eleventh that year. He retired from cycling in 1986.

References

1959 births
2016 deaths
Italian male cyclists
Sportspeople from Cosenza
Cyclists from Calabria